This page details the all-time statistics, records, and other achievements pertaining to the Chicago Bulls.

Individual awards

NBA Most Valuable Player
 Michael Jordan – 1988, 1991, 1992, 1996, 1998
 Derrick Rose – 2011

NBA Defensive Player of the Year
 Michael Jordan – 1988
 Joakim Noah – 2014

NBA Rookie of the Year
 Michael Jordan – 1985
 Elton Brand – 2000 (Co-Rookie of the Year)
 Derrick Rose – 2009

NBA Sixth Man of the Year
 Toni Kukoč – 1996
 Ben Gordon – 2005

NBA Most Improved Player Award
 Jimmy Butler – 2015

NBA Finals MVP
 Michael Jordan – 1991–1993, 1996–1998

Best NBA Player ESPY Award
 Michael Jordan – 1993, 1997–1999

NBA Sportsmanship Award
 Luol Deng – 2007

J. Walter Kennedy Citizenship Award
 Joakim Noah – 2015

NBA Coach of the Year
 Johnny "Red" Kerr – 1967
 Dick Motta – 1971
 Phil Jackson – 1996
 Tom Thibodeau – 2011

NBA Executive of the Year
 Jerry Krause – 1988, 1996
 Gar Forman – 2011 (Co-Executive of the Year)

NBA Scoring Champion
 Michael Jordan – 1987–1993, 1996–1998

All-NBA First Team
 Michael Jordan – 1987–1993, 1996–1998
 Scottie Pippen – 1994–1996
 Derrick Rose – 2011
 Joakim Noah – 2014

All-NBA Second Team
 Bob Love – 1971, 1972
 Norm Van Lier – 1974
 Michael Jordan – 1985
 Scottie Pippen – 1992, 1997
 Pau Gasol – 2015
 DeMar DeRozan – 2022

All-NBA Third Team
 Scottie Pippen – 1993, 1998
 Jimmy Butler – 2017

NBA All-Defensive First Team
 Jerry Sloan – 1969, 1972, 1974, 1975
 Norm Van Lier – 1974, 1976, 1977
 Michael Jordan – 1988–1993, 1996–1998
 Scottie Pippen – 1992–1998
 Dennis Rodman – 1996
 Joakim Noah – 2013, 2014

NBA All-Defensive Second Team
 Jerry Sloan – 1970, 1971
 Norm Van Lier – 1972, 1973, 1975, 1978
 Bob Love – 1972, 1974, 1975
 Artis Gilmore – 1978
 Scottie Pippen – 1991
 Horace Grant – 1993, 1994
 Kirk Hinrich – 2007
 Ben Wallace – 2007
 Joakim Noah – 2011
 Luol Deng – 2012
 Jimmy Butler – 2014, 2016

NBA All-Rookie First Team
 Erwin Mueller – 1967
 Clifford Ray – 1972
 Scott May – 1977
 Reggie Theus – 1979
 David Greenwood – 1980
 Quintin Dailey – 1983
 Michael Jordan – 1985
 Charles Oakley – 1986
 Elton Brand – 2000
 Kirk Hinrich – 2004
 Luol Deng – 2005
 Ben Gordon – 2005
 Derrick Rose – 2009
 Taj Gibson – 2010
 Nikola Mirotić – 2015
 Lauri Markkanen – 2018

NBA All-Rookie Second Team
 Stacey King – 1990
 Toni Kukoč – 1994
 Ron Artest – 2000
 Marcus Fizer – 2001
 Jay Williams – 2003
 Tyrus Thomas – 2007
 Coby White – 2020
 Patrick Williams – 2021
 Ayo Dosunmu – 2022

 Hold the record for the fewest points per game in a season after 1954–55 (81.9 in 1998–99)
 Hold the record for the fewest points in a game after 1954–55 (49, April 10, 1999)
 Hold the record for largest margin of victory in an NBA Finals game (42; defeated the Utah Jazz 96–54)
 Hold the record for fewest points allowed in an NBA Finals game (54 against the Utah Jazz)
 Share lowest free throw percentage by two teams in one game (.410 with the Los Angeles Lakers, February 7, 1968)
 Share record for most personal fouls by two teams in one game (87 with the Portland Trail Blazers, March 16, 1984)
 Shared record: Will Perdue for fewest minutes played by a disqualified player in a playoff game (7 against the New York Knicks, May 14, 1992)
 Dennis Rodman, most offensive rebounds in an NBA Finals game (11 twice against the Seattle SuperSonics in the 1996 NBA Finals)
 Shared record: Two teams with the fewest players to score more than ten points in a playoff game (4 with the Miami Heat, May 24, 1997)
 Highest defensive rebound percentage in a playoff game (.952 against the Golden State Warriors on April 30, 1975)
 Shared record: Highest free throw percentage by one team in a playoff game (1.000 against the Cleveland Cavaliers on May 19, 1992)
 After the San Antonio Spurs lost the 2013 NBA Finals to the Miami Heat in seven games, the Bulls are currently the only NBA franchise to have won multiple NBA championships without a championship series loss.

NBA All-Star Weekend

NBA All-Star selections
 Guy Rodgers – 1967
 Jerry Sloan – 1967, 1969
 Bob Boozer – 1968
 Chet Walker – 1970, 1971, 1973, 1974
 Bob Love – 1971–1973
 Norm Van Lier – 1974, 1976, 1977
 Artis Gilmore – 1978, 1979, 1981, 1982
 Reggie Theus – 1981, 1983
 Michael Jordan – 1985–1993, 1996–1998
 Scottie Pippen – 1990, 1992–1997
 B. J. Armstrong – 1994
 Horace Grant – 1994
 Derrick Rose – 2010–2012
 Luol Deng – 2012, 2013
 Joakim Noah – 2013, 2014
 Pau Gasol – 2015, 2016
 Jimmy Butler – 2015–2017
 Zach LaVine – 2021, 2022
 DeMar DeRozan – 2022, 2023

NBA All-Star head coach
 Phil Jackson – 1992, 1996
 Tom Thibodeau – 2012

NBA All-Star Game MVP
 Michael Jordan – 1988, 1996, 1998
 Scottie Pippen – 1994

NBA All-Star Weekend Skills Challenge
 Derrick Rose – 2009, 2011
 Lauri Markkanen – 2018

NBA All-Star Weekend Three-Point Shootout
 Kyle Macy - 1986
 Craig Hodges – 1989–1993
 Michael Jordan- 1990
 B. J. Armstrong- 1993, 1994
 Steve Kerr – 1994-1997
 Zach LaVine - 2020–2022

NBA All-Star Weekend Slam Dunk Contest
 Orlando Woolridge - 1984, 1985
 Michael Jordan – 1985, 1987, 1988
 Scottie Pippen - 1990
 Tyrus Thomas - 2007

Season records

Franchise records
(Correct as of the end of the 2018–19 season )

Franchise record for wins

Franchise record for championships

NBA records

Individual

Regular season

Playoffs

NBA Finals

Miscellaneous
 Leading the league in scoring, oldest, 35 years, 61 days, Michael Jordan, April 19, 1998
 Leading the league in rebounding, oldest, 36 years, 341 days, Dennis Rodman, April 19, 1998

Team

Regular season

 Teams that had two players score 40+ points in a game, Michael Jordan 44, Scottie Pippen 40, February 18, 1996.
 Best start (41 games), 38–3, .
 Fewest points per game, 81.9, .
 Undefeated months, 14–0, January 1996.

Playoffs
 Best home record, 39–7.

NBA Finals
 Best NBA Finals series record, 6–0.
 Largest margin of victory in a game, 42, June 7, 1998. The Bulls went 6-0 and swept each team they faced in their final games.

Notes

References
General
 
 
 

Specific

External links
Bulls.com Chicago Bulls official site
Chicago Bulls Statistics at Basketball-Reference.com

Accomplishments and records
National Basketball Association accomplishments and records by team